Qaleh-ye Heydar (also Romanized as Qal‘eh-ye Ḩeydar; also known as Derow, Ghal‘eh Gha‘ed Heidar, Qā’ed Ḩeydarī, Qal‘eh-e-Ḩājī Heydar, Qal‘eh Qāid Haidar, Qal‘eh-ye Ḩājjī Ḩeydar, and Qal‘eh-ye Qāyed Ḩeydar) is a village in Hayat Davud Rural District, in the Central District of Ganaveh County, Bushehr Province, Iran. At the 2006 census, its population was 287, in 70 families.

References 

Populated places in Ganaveh County